John Steele (24 November 1916 – 14 January 2008) was a Scottish football player and manager.

Steele signed for Barnsley from Ayr United for £2,500 in June 1938. He died of a stroke on 14 January 2008, at the age of 91.

Managerial stats
Updated 27 August 2007.

References

External links
 

1916 births
2008 deaths
Footballers from Glasgow
Scottish footballers
Association football inside forwards
Ayr United F.C. players
Barnsley F.C. players
Barnsley F.C. managers
Scottish football managers
English Football League players
East Fife F.C. players
Scottish Football League players
Scottish Junior Football Association players
Lesmahagow F.C. players
Greenock Morton F.C. wartime guest players
Aberdeen F.C. wartime guest players